Barntrup is a town in the Lippe district of North Rhine-Westphalia, Germany. It has an area of 59.46 km² and 8,501 inhabitants (2019).
It lies 40 km east from Bielefeld and 9 km west from Bad Pyrmont at the east border of NRW to Lower Saxony.

Town division
 Alverdissen, a former residence of the House of Lippe-Alverdissen
 Barntrup
 Selbeck
 Sommersell
 Sonneborn

History
Barntrup and Alverdissen were founded by the Earl of Sternberg in the year 1220. Originally Barntrup was called Barendorf and was a village at the Schratweg. Between 1317 and 1359 Barntrup was built on the highest point of the "Thornesberg" which is 189 m high above sea level. This is the central point of Barntrup.

Kerssenbrock Castle (also called Schloss Kerssenbrock or Barntrup Castle, see picture) was constructed from 1584-1588 by Anna von Kerssenbrock (maiden name Anna von Canstein). Her husband, Franz von Kerssenbrock, had been a mercenary in the French Wars of Religion, where he had made much money. The Kerssenbrock family was one of the main noble families in the region. It is still today owned by the von Kerssenbrock-Krosigk family.

Education
 Primary school "von-Haxthausen Grundschule" has at this time 420 pupils and 21 teachers.
 High school "Städtisches Gymnasium Barntrup" has about 920 pupils and 50 teachers.
 Junior high school "Hauptschule des Schulverbandes Barntrup-Dörentrup" has about 350 pupils.

Sons and daughters of the town

 Hermann von Kerssenbroch (1519-1585), longtime rector of the High School Paulinum in Münster (Westfalen)
 Heinrich Meibom (1555-1625), poet and historian
 Ludwig Winter (1894, † unknown), politician (NSDAP)
 Ulrich Born (born  1950), lawyer and politician (CDU)

Literature

Economy 
The power transmission and industrial automation company KEB Automation KG is located in Barntrup.

References

External links

 Official website (in German)

Lippe
Principality of Lippe